This is a list of landmarks, structures of merit and historical districts in Berkeley, California. "Structures of Merit" is a classification given by the City of Berkeley for buildings of local historic importance.

National Historic Landmarks and Districts
 Anna Head School for Girls - 2538 Channing Way
 Berkeley Day Nursery - 2031 6th St.
 Berkeley High School Historic Campus District—1980 Allston Way, Berkeley, CA  94704
 Berkeley Hillside Club - 2286 Cedar St.
 Berkeley Historic Civic Center District - Roughly bounded by McKinney Ave., Addison St., Shattuck Ave., and Kittredge St.
 Berkeley Public Library - 2090 Kittredge St.
 Berkeley Women's City Club - 2315 Durant Ave.
 Boone's University School - 2029 Durant Ave.
 Bowles Hall - Stadium and Gayley Way
 California Hall - Oxford St.
 Chamber of Commerce Building - 2140—2144 Shattuck Ave. & 2071—2089 Center St.
 Church of the Good Shepherd-Episcopal - 1001 Hearst St. at Ninth St.
 City Hall - 2134 Grove St.
 Cloyne Court Hotel - 2600 Ridge Rd.
 College Women's Club - 2680 Bancroft Way
 Corder Building - 2300—2350 Shattuck Ave.
 Cowell Memorial Hospital - 2215 College Ave.
 Doe Memorial Library - Oxford St.
 Drawing Building - Hearst Ave., University of California campus
 Durant Hall - Oxford St.
 Edwards Stadium - junction of Bancroft Way and Fulton St., UC Berkeley campus
 Faculty Club - Oxford St.
 First Church of Christ, Scientist - 2619 Dwight Way
 First Unitarian Church - 2401 Bancroft Way
 Founders' Rock - Oxford St.
 Fox Court - 1472—1478 University Ave.
 Garfield Intermediate School - 1414 Walnut St.
 Giannini Hall - Oxford St.
 Girton Hall - Off College Ave. next to Cowell Hospital, University of California, Berkeley campus
 Golden Sheaf Bakery - 2069—2071 Addison St.
 Haviland Hall - University of California Campus
 Hearst Greek Theatre - Oxford St.
 Hearst Gymnasium for Women - Oxford St.
 Hearst Memorial Mining Building - Oxford St.
 Hilgard Hall - Oxford St.
 Hillside School - 1581 Leroy Ave.
 LeConte Hall - Hearst and Gayley
 Loring House - 1730 Spruce St.
 Masonic Temple - 2105 Bancroft Way and 2295 Shattuck Ave.
 North Gate Hall - Oxford St.
 Phi Delta Theta Chapter House - 2717 Hearst Ave.
 Room 307, Gilman Hall, University of California - University of California at Berkeley campus
 Sather Gate and Bridge - U.C.Berkeley
 Sather Tower 
 Senior Hall - University of California, Berkeley campus
 South Hall - Oxford St.
 St. John's Presbyterian Church - 2640 College Ave.
 State Asylum for the Deaf, Dumb and Blind - bounded by Dwight Way, City line, Derby and Warring Streets
 Studio Building - 2045 Shattuck Ave.
 Thorsen, William R., House - 2307 Piedmont Ave.
 Toveri Tupa (Old Finnish Hall) - 1819 10th St.
 Tupper and Reed Building - 2275 Shattuck Ave.
 U.S. Post Office - 2000 Milvia St.
 University House - Oxford St.
 Wellman Hall - Oxford St.
 Wheeler Hall - Oxford St.

City-designated landmarks, structures of merit, and historic districts 
 1814 Sixth Street - 1814 Sixth Street
 82 Shattuck Square - 82 Shattuck Square
 A.H. Broad House and Storefronts - 2117 Kittredge Street
 ABSW Campus - 2501 Hillegass Avenue
 Acheson Physicians' Building - 2131 University Avenue
 The Albra Apartments - 2530 Durant Avenue
 Allen Freeman House, Allenoke Manor - 1777 Le Roy Avenue
 Alphonso House - 802 Delaware Street
 American Trust Building - 2140 Shattuck Avenue
 Andrews House - 1812 Sixth Street
 Anna Head School - 2410 Bowditch Street
 Armstrong College - 2222 Harold Way
 Ashkenaz - 1317 San Pablo Avenue
 Ayers House - 2528 Benvenue Avenue
 Barker Building - 2484 Shattuck Avenue
 Bartlett Houses - 2201 & 2205 Blake Street
 Bell House - 2118 Marin Avenue
 Benjamin Ferris House - 2314 Dwight Way
 Benjamin Ide Wheeler House and Garden - 1820 Scenic Avenue
 Bentley House - 2683 Le Conte Avenue
 Berkeley Bay Commons - 1917 Berkeley Way
 Berkeley City Club - 2315 Durant Avenue
 Berkeley High School Community Theater - 2223 Martin Luther King Jr. Way
 The Berkeley Inn (demolished) - 2501 Haste Street
 Berkeley Main Post Office - 2004 Allston Way
 Berkeley Municipal Incinerator - 1120 Second Street
 Berkeley Municipal Rose Garden - 1300 Euclid Avenue
 Berkeley Piano Club - 2724 & 2726 Haste Street
 Berkeley Public Library - 2090 Kittredge Street
 Berkeley Shellmound - Fourth Street at University Ave.
 Berkeley Tennis Club - 2624 Hillegass Avenue
 Bertin Properties - 1952 University Avenue
 Bertin Properties - 1960 University Avenue
 Beta Theta Pi Chapter House - 2607 Hearst Avenue
 Bevatron site - One Cyclotron Road
 Bishop Photo Studio - 2125 Durant Avenue
 Blood House - 2526 Durant Avenue
 Bonita Apartments - 1940 University Avenue
 Bonita House - 1410 Bonita Avenue
 Boone's University School - 2029 Durant Avenue
 Borja House - 1629 Fifth Street
 Bowen's Inn Higgins Grocery - 834 Delaware Street
 Bowles Hall - U.C. Berkeley Campus
 The Brasfield - 2520 Durant Avenue
 Brooks Apartment Bldg. - 2231 Shattuck Avenue
 California Hall - U.C. Berkeley Campus
 California Ink Co. - 1332 Fourth Street
 California Memorial Stadium - U.C. Berkeley Campus
 California School for the Deaf and Blind, now Clark Kerr Campus - 2601 Warring Street
 Captain Boudrow House - 1536 Oxford Street
 Captain Maury House - 1317 Shattuck Avenue
 Carlson's Block - 3228 Adeline Street
 Carrick House & Cottages - 1418 Spruce Street
 Carrington House - 1029 Addison Street
 Casa Bonita Apartments - 2605 Haste Street
 Charles Keeler Place - 1770 Highland Place   
 Charles Keeler Studio - 1736 Highland Place
 Charles R. Brown House - 1614 Sixth Street
 Charles Rieber House - 15 Canyon Road
 Charles Wilkinson House - 2730 Dwight Way
 Chase Building - 2107 Shattuck Avenue
 Church by the Side of the Road - 2108 Russell Street
 Church of the Good Shepherd - 1823 Ninth Street
 Civic Center Building - 2180 Milvia Street
 Civic Center Historic District 
 Claremont Court Gate and Street Markers - Claremont Court 
 Claremont District Public Amenities
 Clephane Building - 3027 Adeline Street
 Cloyne Court - 2600 Ridge Road
 College Women's Club - 2680 Bancroft Way
 Cooper Woodworking Building - 1250 Addison Street
 Corder Bldg - 2300 Shattuck Avenue
 Corkill House (Frederick and Amy) - 2611 Ashby Avenue
 Cornelius Beach Bradley House - 2639 Durant Avenue
 Corporation Yard Building - 1326 Allston Way
 Creamery Livery Stables Red Cross (demolished) - 2112 Allston Way
 Cutter Laboratories - 700 Parker Street
 Daggett House - 1427 Hawthorne Terrace
 Dakin Warehouse - 2750 Adeline Street
 Daley's Scenic Park Tract Street Improvements
 Davis-Byrne Building - 2134 Dwight Way
 Davis-Harmes House - 1828 Fifth Street
 Delaware Street Historic District District
 Dickman House - 2551 Benvenue Avenue
 Doe Memorial Library - U.C. Berkeley Campus
 Donogh Arms - 2276 Shattuck Avenue
 Downtown YMCA - 2001 Allston Way
 Durant Hall, formerly Boalt Hall - U.C. Berkeley Campus
 Durant Hotel - 2600 Durant Avenue
 Durkee Famous Foods Plant - 740 Heinz Street
 EBMUD Vine Street Pumping Plant - 2113 Vine Street
 Edgar Jensen House - 1650 La Vereda Road
 Edwards Stadium - U.C. Berkeley Campus
 Eleanor Smith House and Cottage - 2527 Hillegass Avenue
 Elizabeth M. Kenney Cottage - 1275 University Avenue
 Elks' Club - 2018 Allston Way
 Elmer Buckman House - 920 Shattuck Avenue
 Elmwood Hardware Building - 2947–2993 College Avenue
 Epworth Hall - 2521 Channing Way
 Ernest V. Cowell Memorial Hospital - U.C. Berkeley Campus
 Everett Glass House - 70 Twain Avenue
 F.A. Thomas House - 883 Arlington
 Faculty Club & Faculty Glade - U.C. Berkeley Campus
 Farley House - 147 Tunnel Road
 Fidelity Savings Building - 2323 Shattuck Avenue
 First Church of Christ, Scientist - 2619 Dwight Way
 First Unitarian Church - 2401 Bancroft Way
 Former Garfield School - 1414 Walnut Avenue
 Founders' Rock - U.C. Berkeley Campus
 Fox Commons - 1670 University Avenue
 Fox Court - 1472 University Avenue
 Framat Lodge - 1900 Addison Street
 Francis K. Shattuck Building - 2100 Shattuck Avenue
 Fred Turner Building - 2546 Bancroft Way
 Fullen Market Building - 1531 San Pablo Avenue
 George Edwards House - 2530 Dwight Way
 Ghego House - 1809 Fourth Street
 Giannini Hall - U.C. Berkeley Campus
 Golden Sheaf Bakery - 2071 Addison Street
 Gorman & Son Bldg. - 2597 Telegraph Avenue
 Grace Baptist Church - 936 Channing Way
 Grace North Church - 2138 Cedar Street
 Greenwood Common - 1 through 10 Greenwood Common
 H.J. Heinz Co. Factory - 2900 San Pablo Avenue
 Harmon Gymnasium - Haas Pavilion - U.C. Berkeley Campus
 Haviland Hall - U.C. Berkeley Campus
 Hearst Greek Theater - U.C. Berkeley Campus
 Hearst Mining Building - U.C. Berkeley Campus
 Heron Building - 2136-2140 University Avenue
 Heywood Apartment Bldg - 2119 Addison Street
 Heywood House - 1808 Fifth Street
 Hilgard Hall - U.C. Berkeley Campus
 Hillside Club - 2286 Cedar Street
 Hillside School - 1581 Le Roy Avenue
 Hobart Hall - 2600 Dwight Way
 Hoffman Building - 2988–2992 Adeline Street
 Hotel Shattuck Plaza - 2200 Shattuck Avenue
 Howard Automobile Showroom - 2140 Durant Avenue
 Hunrick Grocery - 2211 Rose Street
 Hunter House - 2418 California Street
 India Block - 3250 Adeline Street
 James Edgar House - 2437 Dwight Way
 Jefferson School - 1475 Rose Street
 Jeffress House - 2944 Elmwood Court
 Jennie C. Smith House - 2539 Benvenue Avenue
 Jensen House - 1675 La Loma Avenue
 John Brennan House - 1124 Addison Street
 John Galen Howard House - 1401 Le Roy Avenue
 John Hinkel Park 
 John Muir School - 2955 Claremont Avenue
 Josiah J. Rose-Goldsmith House - 2919 Lorina Street
 Judah Magnes Memorial Museum - 2905 Russell Street
 Kappa Sigma House - 2220 Piedmont Avenue
 Kawneer Manufacturing Co. - 2547 Eight Street
 Kerna Maybeck Gannon House - 2780 Buena Vista Way
 King Building - 2501 Telegraph Avenue
 Kingman Hall - 1730 La Loma Avenue
 Kluegel House - 2667–2669 Le Conte Avenue
 Kress Store - 2036 Shattuck Avenue

 Kueffer House - 2430 Fulton Street
 La Loma Park Historic District District
 La Loma Steps - between Le Roy Avenue & Buena Vista Way
 Landscape Features - U.C. Berkeley Campus
 Lawson House - 1515 La Loma Avenue
 Longfellow Middle School - 1500 Derby Street
 Lorin Theater - 3332 Adeline Street
 Loring House - 1730 Spruce Street
 Manasse-Block Tanning Company - 1300 Fourth Street
 Marsh House - 2308 Durant Avenue
 Marshall House #3 - 2740 Telegraph Avenue
 Marshall House #4 - 2744 Telegraph Avenue
 Marshall-Lindblom House - 2601 Hillegass Avenue
 Martin House - 2411 Fifth Street
 Martin Luther King Jr. Civic Center Park
 Mason-McDuffie Company - 2107 Shattuck Avenue
 Masonic Temple - 2295 Shattuck Avenue
 Maurer House - 1448 Sixth Street
 Maybeck Cottage - 1 Maybeck Twin Drive
 McCreary/Greer House - 2318 Durant Avenue
 McGregor House - 1962 Yosemite Road
 McKinley School - 2419 Haste Street
 Mercantile Trust Co. - 2959 College Avenue
 Merton J. Cogdon House - 2527 Piedmont Avenue
 Mikkelsen & Berry Building - 2124 Center Street
 Montgomery House - 45 Oak Ridge Road
 Morgan Building - 2053 Berkeley Way
 Morning Glory House - 2007 Berkeley Way
 Morrill Apartments - 2429 Shattuck Avenue
 Morrison House- 2532 Benvenue Avenue
 Morse Block - 2276 Shattuck Avenue
 Naval Architecture Building-Drawing Building - U.C. Berkeley Campus
 Niehaus House - 839 Channing Way
 Nixon/Kennedy House - 1537 Euclid Avenue
 Normandy Village - 1781 Spruce Street
 Normandy Village - 1785 Spruce Street
 Normandy Village - 1793 Spruce Street
 Normandy Village - 1815 Spruce Street
 Normandy Village - 1831 Spruce Street
 Normandy Village - 1835 Spruce Street
 North Branch Berkeley Public Library - 1170 The Alameda
 Northbrae Public Improvements Areas
 Northern Bertha Bosse Cottage - 2424 Fulton Street
 Northgate Hall - U.C. Berkeley Campus
 Oaks Theatre - 1861 Solano Avenue
 Odd Fellows Temple - 2288 Fulton Street
 Old City Hall - 2134 MLK Jr Way
 Old City Hall Annex - 1835 Allston Way
 Orchard Lane - Panoramic Hill 
 Oscar Maurer Studio - 1772 Le Roy Avenue
 People's Bicentennial Mural - 2500 Haste Street
 People's Park - 2526 Haste Street
 Phi Delta Theta Chapter House - 1822 Highland Place
 Phi Delta Theta Chapter House - 2717 Hearst Avenue
 Phi Gamma Delta Chapter House - 2395 Piedmont Avenue
 Phi Kappa Psi Chapter House - 1770 La Loma Avenue
 Piedmont Avenue Areas
 Plachek Building - 2014 Shattuck Avenue
 Ralph White House - 1841 Marin Avenue
 Richfield Oil Company - 1952 Oxford Street
 The Robcliff Apartments - 2515 Channing Way
 Roberts Studio (YWCA) - 2134 Allston Way
 Room 307, Gilman Hall - U.C. Berkeley Campus
 Roos Bros. Building - 63 Shattuck Square
 Rose Berteaux Cottage - 2350 Bowditch Street
 Rose Walk - 60 Codornices Road
 Rose Walk - 1400 Le Roy Avenue
 Rose Walk - 2500 Rose Walk
 Rose Walk - 2501 Rose Walk
 Rose Walk - 2518 Rose Walk
 Rose Walk - 2555 Rose Walk
 Rose Walk Areas
 St. John's Presbyterian Church - 2640 College Avenue
 Saint Joseph the Worker - 1640 Addison Street
 Samuel Davis House - 2547 Channing Way
 Samuel Hume House (AKA Hume Castle) - 2900 Buena Vista Way 
 Santa Fe Railway Station - 1310 University Avenue
 Sather Gate and Bridge - U.C. Berkeley Campus
 Sather Tower - U.C. Berkeley Campus
 Sell Building - 2154–2160 University Avenue
 Senior Hall - U.C. Berkeley Campus
 Shattuck Square - 48 Shattuck Square
 Sill’s Grocery & Hardware Company - 2139 University Avenue
 Silva House - 1824 Fifth Street
 Sisterna Historic District - West Berkeley
 Site of Byrne House - 1301 Oxford Street
 Smith House - 2301 Hearst Avenue

 Soda Water Works Building - 2509-2513 Telegraph Avenue
 South Berkeley Bank - 3286 Adeline Street
 South Hall - U.C. Berkeley Campus
 Southern Bertha Bosse Cottage - 2426 Fulton Street
 Southern Pacific Railroad Station - 700 University Avenue
 Spenger's Fish Grotto - 1915 Fourth Street
 Spring Estate - 1960 San Antonio Avenue
 Squires Building - 2100 Vine Street
 Standard Die & Specialty Company - 2701 Eighth Street
 Strand Theater Elmwood Theater - 2966 College Avenue
 Stuart House - 2524 Dwight Way
 Studio Building - 2037 Shattuck Avenue
 Suendermann Building - 921 University Avenue
 Sutcliff Picnic Rock - 550 Santa Rosa Avenue
 Swink House, Cottage and Garden - 1525 Shattuck Avenue
 Tellefsen Hall Volney Moody House - 1755 Le Roy Avenue
 Temple of Wings - 2800 Buena Vista Way
 Thorsen House Sigma Phi - 2806 Bancroft Way
 Thousand Oaks School - 840 Colusa Avenue
 Toveri Tupa Building (Finnish Hall) - 1819 Tenth Street
 Town & Gown Club - 2447 Dana Street
 Tufts House #3 - 2733 Buena Vista Way
 Tupper & Reed Building - 2271 Shattuck Avenue
 UC Theater - 2018 University Avenue
 Underwood Building - 2110 Addison Street
 Unit 1 - 2650 Durant Avenue (includes Freeborn Hall)
 Unit 2 - 2650 Haste Street
 University House - U.C. Berkeley Campus
 University of California Press Building - 2120 Oxford Street
 U.S. Realty Company - 1987 Shattuck Avenue
 Veterans Memorial Building - 1931 Center Street
 Villa Wiley House and Cottages - 2545 Benvenue Avenue
 Wallace W. Clark Building - 2375–2377 Shattuck Avenue
 Warren Cheney Houses - 2241 College Avenue
 Waste & Clark Apts. - 2126 Bancroft Way
 Webb Block - 1985 Ashby Avenue
 Weisbrod Building - 2001 San Pablo Avenue
 Wellman Hall - U.C. Berkeley Campus
 West Berkeley Branch Library - 1125 University Avenue
 West Berkeley Children's Center Day Nursery - 2031 Sixth Street
 West Berkeley Macaroni Factory - 2215 Fifth Street
 West Berkeley YWCA - 2009 Tenth Street
 Westenberg House - 2811 Benvenue Avenue
 Westminster Hall - 2700 Bancroft Way
 Westminster Presbyterian Church - 1901 Eight Street
 Wheeler Hall - U.C. Berkeley Campus
 Whittier School - 1645 Milvia Street
 William E. Colby House - 2901 Channing Way
 William Such Building - 2140 Oxford Street
 Williams Building - 2126 Dwight Way
 Williamson Building - 2120 Dwight Way
 Woodworth House - 2237 Carleton Street
 Woolley House - 2509 Haste Street

See also
List of locally designated landmarks by U.S. state

References

External links
City of Berkeley Landmarks Preservation Commission
Berkeley Landmarks - published by the Berkeley Architectural Heritage Association (BAHA). This is the most complete and up-to-date listing of designated landmarks, structures of merit, and historic districts in Berkeley. Includes photographs and articles.

Landmarks
 
 
Berkeley
Berkeley
Berkeley landmarks, structures of merit, historic districts
Berkeley
Berkeley
History of Alameda County, California